Pointe Vele Airport  is an airport serving Futuna Island in the French overseas territory of Wallis and Futuna.

Facilities

Airlines and destinations

Statistics

Temperature record

See also

Hihifo Airport
List of airports in Wallis and Futuna

References

External links
 

Airports in Wallis and Futuna